"Something to Talk About" is a song by British musical artist Badly Drawn Boy from About a Boy. It was released as a single on 10 June 2002. It peaked at number 28 on the UK Singles Chart.

Music video
A music video was filmed to promote the song, and features Hugh Grant watching Badly Drawn Boy performing the song on TV.

Track listing

References

External links 
 

2002 singles
Badly Drawn Boy songs
Song recordings produced by Tom Rothrock